The Douglas County Courthouse and Auditor's Office in Armour, South Dakota was listed on the National Register of Historic Places in 1978.

The courthouse, built in 1927, is a Classical Revival building designed by Sioux Falls architects Perkins & McWayne.  It is a three-story red brick building,  in plan, with brick laid in Flemish bond.

The former auditor's office, which in 1976 was the Douglas County Museum, is a one-story brick building designed by W.L. Dow & Son which was built in 1902.

References

External links

Armour South Dakota

Courthouses in South Dakota
Museums in Douglas County, South Dakota
History museums in South Dakota
Courthouses on the National Register of Historic Places in South Dakota
Neoclassical architecture in South Dakota
Government buildings completed in 1927
Douglas County, South Dakota